Hypoparathyroidism is decreased function of the parathyroid glands with underproduction of parathyroid hormone (PTH). This can lead to low levels of calcium in the blood, often causing cramping and twitching of muscles or tetany (involuntary muscle contraction), and several other symptoms. It is a very rare disease. The condition can be inherited, but it is also encountered after thyroid or parathyroid gland surgery, and it can be caused by immune system-related damage as well as a number of rarer causes. The diagnosis is made with blood tests, and other investigations such as genetic testing depending on the results. The primary treatment of hypoparathyroidism is calcium and vitamin D supplementation. Calcium replacement or vitamin D can ameliorate the symptoms but can increase the risk of kidney stones and chronic kidney disease. Additionally, medications such as recombinant human parathyroid hormone or teriparatide may be given by injection to replace the missing hormone.

Signs and symptoms
The main symptoms of hypoparathyroidism are the result of the low blood calcium level, which interferes with normal muscle contraction and nerve conduction. As a result, people with hypoparathyroidism can experience paresthesia, an unpleasant tingling sensation around the mouth and in the hands and feet, as well as muscle cramps and severe spasms known as "tetany" that affect the hands and feet. Many also report a number of subjective symptoms such as fatigue, headaches, bone pain and insomnia. Crampy abdominal pain may occur. Physical examination of someone with hypocalcemia may show tetany, but it is also possible to provoke tetany of the facial muscles by tapping on the facial nerve (a phenomenon known as Chvostek's sign) or by using the cuff of a sphygmomanometer to temporarily obstruct the blood flow to the arm (a phenomenon known as Trousseau's sign of latent tetany).

A number of medical emergencies can arise in people with low calcium levels. These are seizures, severe irregularities in the normal heart beat, as well as spasm of the upper part of the airways or the smaller airways known as the bronchi (both potentially causing respiratory failure).

Related conditions

Causes
Hypoparathyroidism can have the following causes:
 Removal of, or trauma to, the parathyroid glands due to thyroid surgery (thyroidectomy), parathyroid surgery (parathyroidectomy) or other surgical interventions in the central part of the neck (such as operations on the larynx and/or pharynx) is a recognized cause. It is the most common cause of hypoparathyroidism. Although surgeons generally make attempts to spare normal parathyroid glands at surgery, inadvertent injury to the glands or their blood supply is still common. When this happens, the parathyroids may cease functioning. This is usually temporary but occasionally long term (permanent).
 Kenny-Caffey Syndrome
 Autoimmune invasion and destruction is the most common non-surgical cause. It can occur as part of autoimmune polyendocrine syndromes.
 Hemochromatosis can lead to iron accumulation and consequent dysfunction of a number of endocrine organs, including the parathyroids.
 Absence or dysfunction of the parathyroid glands is one of the components of chromosome 22q11 microdeletion syndrome (other names: DiGeorge syndrome, Schprintzen syndrome, velocardiofacial syndrome).
 Magnesium deficiency
 A defect in the calcium receptor leads to a rare congenital form of the disease
 Idiopathic (of unknown cause)
 Occasionally due to other hereditary causes (e.g. Barakat syndrome (HDR syndrome) a genetic development disorder resulting in hypoparathyroidism, sensorineural deafness, and kidney disease)

Mechanism
The parathyroid glands are so named because they are usually located behind the thyroid gland in the neck. They arise during fetal development from structures known as the third and fourth pharyngeal pouch. The glands, usually four in number, contain the parathyroid chief cells that sense the level of calcium in the blood through the calcium-sensing receptor and secrete parathyroid hormone. Magnesium is required for PTH secretion. Under normal circumstances, the parathyroids secrete PTH to maintain a calcium level within normal limits, as calcium is required for adequate muscle and nerve function (including the autonomic nervous system). PTH acts on several organs to increase calcium levels. It increases calcium absorption in the bowel, while in the kidney it prevents calcium excretion and increases phosphate release and in bone it increases calcium through bone resorption.

Diagnosis
Diagnosis is by measurement of calcium, serum albumin (for correction) and PTH in blood. If necessary, measuring cAMP (cyclic AMP) in the urine after an intravenous dose of PTH can help in the distinction between hypoparathyroidism and other causes.

Differential diagnoses are:
 Pseudohypoparathyroidism (normal PTH levels but tissue insensitivity to the hormone, associated with intellectual disability and skeletal deformities) and pseudopseudohypoparathyroidism.
 Vitamin D deficiency or hereditary insensitivity to this vitamin (X-linked dominant).
 Malabsorption
 Kidney disease
 Medication: steroids, diuretics, some antiepileptics.

Other tests include ECG for abnormal heart rhythms, and measurement of blood magnesium levels.

Treatment
Severe hypocalcaemia, a potentially life-threatening condition,  is treated as soon as possible with intravenous calcium (e.g. as calcium gluconate). Generally, a central venous catheter is recommended, as the calcium can irritate peripheral veins and cause phlebitis. In the event of a life-threatening attack of low calcium levels or tetany (prolonged muscle contractions), calcium is administered by intravenous (IV) infusion. Precautions are taken to prevent seizures or larynx spasms. The heart is monitored for abnormal rhythms until the person is stable. When the life-threatening attack has been controlled, treatment continues with medicine taken by mouth as often as four times a day.

Long-term treatment of hypoparathyroidism is with vitamin D analogs and calcium supplementation, but may be ineffective in some due to potential renal damage. The N-terminal fragment of parathyroid hormone (PTH 1-34) has full biological activity. The use of pump delivery of synthetic PTH 1-34 provides the closest approach to physiologic PTH replacement therapy. Injections of recombinant human parathyroid hormone are available as treatment in those with low blood calcium levels.

A 2019 systematic review has highlighted that there is a lack of high-quality evidence for the use of vitamin D, calcium, or recombinant parathyroid hormone in the management of both temporary and long-term hypoparathyroidism following thyroidectomy.

See also 
 Hyperparathyroidism

References

External links 

Parathyroid disorders
Endocrine-related cutaneous conditions
Rare diseases